Paxos or Paxi is a Greek island in the Ionian sea.

Paxos may also refer to:
 Paxos (computer science), a family of algorithms
 Paxos Trust Company, an American financial institution and technology company

See also 
 Paxo